Shuga may refer to:

Shuga (TV series), an MTV TV series 
Shuga (ice), a form of ice suspended in water
Shuga Cain, American drag queen